Vinaq (also Romanized as Vīnaq; also known as Vinek) is a village in Minjavan-e Sharqi Rural District, Minjavan District, Khoda Afarin County, East Azerbaijan Province, Iran. At the 2006 census, its population was 141, in 32 families.

References 

Populated places in Khoda Afarin County